Ross Thornton (born 23 October 1956) is a former Australian rules footballer who played with Fitzroy in the VFL during the 1980s.

Thornton originally arrived at Fitzroy in 1975 but was unable to make the seniors so joined VFA club Prahran. He returned to Fitzroy in 1980 and became a regular fixture in their defence for the rest of the decade, usually occupying a back pocket from where he liked to run the ball up the ground. A personal highlight came in 1984 when he won Fitzroy's Best and fairest award.

In 2003 he was selected in Prahran's Team of the Century.

Thornton appeared on the second season of The Amazing Race Australia with his daughter Tarryn, and was eliminated in 8th place in Turkey on Episode 6.

References

Holmesby, Russell and Main, Jim (2007). The Encyclopedia of AFL Footballers. 7th ed. Melbourne: Bas Publishing.

1956 births
Living people
Fitzroy Football Club players
Mitchell Medal winners
Prahran Football Club players
Camperdown Football Club players
Australian rules footballers from Victoria (Australia)
The Amazing Race contestants